The Roman Catholic Church in Bulgaria, joint in an episcopal conference (Mejduritualnata Episcopska Konferenzia vâv Bâlgaria), comprises only exempt sees:
 two Latin exempt bishoprics
 an Eastern Catholic pre-diocesan (exempt) jurisdiction

There is also an Apostolic Nunciature to Bulgaria as papal diplomatic representation (embassy-level) in the national capital Sofia (into which is also vested the Apostolic Nunciature to Macedonia).

Current jurisdictions

Latin exempt jurisdictions 
 Roman Catholic Diocese of Nikopol
 Roman Catholic Diocese of Sofia and Plovdiv

Eastern Catholic 
sole remaining jurisdiction of a rite-specific particular church sui juris - Byzantine Rite, Bulgarian language 
 Bulgarian Catholic Apostolic Exarchate of Sofia (covering all and only Bulgaria)

Defunct jurisdictions

Titular sees 
 seven Metropolitan Titular archbishoprics: Marcianopolis, Philippopolis in Thracia, Preslavus, Ratiaria, Serdica, Ternobus, Velebusdus
 four other Titular archbishoprics: Anchialus, Beroë, Mesembria, Odessus
 fourteen Episcopal Titular bishoprics: Abrittum, Appiaria, Bononia, Bucellus, Castra Martis, Deultum, Dorostorum, Germania in Dacia, Margum, Nicopolis ad Iaternum, Novæ, Œscus, Sozopolis in Hæmimonto, Transmarisca

Other defunct jurisdictions 
All other defunct jurisdictions have current successor sees.

See also 
 List of Catholic dioceses (structured view)

Sources and external links 
 GCatholic - data for all sections

Bulgaria

Catholic dioceses